Robert van Boxel (born 20 January 1983 in Zwanenburg) is a Dutch professional footballer who currently plays as a centre back for FC Lisse in the Dutch Derde Divisie.

Club career
He spent a few season in the PSV youth academy and played for  ADO Den Haag, AGOVV Apeldoorn, SC Cambuur, MVV and Sparta Rotterdam, who loaned him back to Cambuur in 2013. He joined amateur side FC Lisse in summer 2015 from Sparta.

Personal life
While playing for Lisse, van Boxel studied entrepreneurship and worked for a mobile telephone and internet service provider.

References

External links
 Voetbal International profile 

1983 births
Living people
People from Haarlemmermeer
Association football central defenders
Dutch footballers
PSV Eindhoven players
ADO Den Haag players
AGOVV Apeldoorn players
MVV Maastricht players
SC Cambuur players
Sparta Rotterdam players
FC Lisse players
Eredivisie players
Eerste Divisie players
Derde Divisie players
Footballers from North Holland